Blind Date is a 1934 American drama film directed by Roy William Neill and starring Ann Sothern, Neil Hamilton, and Paul Kelly.

Plot

Kitty (Ann Sothern), is a hardworking switchboard operator who is engaged to auto mechanic Bill (Paul Kelly). When Bill opens his own garage, the demands of running his own business soon take a toll on his relationship with Kitty. Frustrated, Kitty agrees to go on a blind date with Bob (Neil Hamilton), the wealthy son of a department store titan. When sparks fly, Kitty is soon forced to make a difficult choice between the two men.

Cast
 Ann Sothern as Kitty Taylor
 Neil Hamilton as Bob Hartwell
 Paul Kelly as Bill Lowry
 Jane Darwell as Ma Taylor
 Spencer Charters as Charlie [Pa] Taylor
 Joan Gale as Flora Taylor
 Mickey Rooney as Freddie Taylor
 Geneva Mitchell as Dot
 Henry Kolker as J. W. Hartwell, Sr.
 Tyler Brooke as Emory
 Billie Seward as Barbara Hartwell

References

External links 
 
 
 

1934 films
American black-and-white films
Films based on American novels
1934 romantic drama films
Columbia Pictures films
American romantic drama films
Films directed by Roy William Neill
1930s English-language films
1930s American films